John Bridgwood is a former Australian rules footballer, who played a state match for Western Australia in 1971, as well as 124 games in the WAFL for the Claremont Football Club.

Biography 
The son of former Claremont player Maurie Bridgwood who played 169 games for the club. Bridgwood's main focus as a junior was athletics, where he was a state hurdle champion. In 1968, he won the fairest and best award for the first XVIII at Aquinas College in Western Australia. He made his debut in 1969 for Claremont. Bridgwood became a regular in the league side the following season, and was runner up to Bruce Duperouzel for the Ben Cook medal as Claremont’s fairest and best in 1971, as well as gaining State selection.  He retired at the end of the 1977 season due to injuries at the age of 26.

References 

Australian rules footballers from Western Australia
People educated at Aquinas College, Perth
Claremont Football Club players
Living people
1951 births